Aritz López Garai (born 6 November 1980) is a Spanish former footballer who played as a central midfielder, currently a manager.

He amassed Segunda División totals of 325 matches and 13 goals over nine seasons, in representation of six clubs. In La Liga, he played six games with Córdoba.

In 2017, López Garai started working as a manager.

Playing career
López Garai was born in Barakaldo, Biscay. An unsuccessful youth graduate of Athletic Bilbao, he spent the vast majority of his professional career in the second and third divisions.

López Garai represented CD Basconia (Bilbao's farm team), Gernika Club, UB Conquense, UD Salamanca, CD Castellón, RC Celta de Vigo, Córdoba CF – two spells – and Sporting de Gijón, rarely settling with a team but being always first choice. He signed with Andalusia's Córdoba for the second time in summer 2014 following a short loan spell with the same club from Gijón, and made his La Liga debut on 25 August 2014 at the age of 33, starting in a 2–0 away loss against Real Madrid.

On 28 January 2015, López Garai terminated his contract with the Blanquiverdes. Less than one month later he moved abroad for the first time in his career, joining Romania's FC Rapid București.

Coaching career
For the 2015–16 campaign, López Garai represented Doxa Katokopias FC in Cyprus and CF Reus Deportiu, achieving promotion to the second division with the latter side. On 15 June 2017, they announced the 36-year-old would retire and become its head coach with immediate effect, replacing Real Zaragoza-bound Natxo González.

On 24 June 2018, López Garai was appointed manager of CD Numancia after terminating his contract with Reus. He signed a new contract with the former club the following 19 February, but reached an agreement to leave on 11 June.

On 21 June 2019, López Garai was named at the helm of CD Tenerife still in the second tier. On 17 November, he was dismissed.

López Garai took over Albacete Balompié of the same league on 14 October 2020 after nearly one year of inactivity, replacing the dismissed Lucas Alcaraz. He was himself relieved of his duties on 6 December, after only winning three points out of the last 27.

Club statistics

Managerial statistics

References

External links

1980 births
Living people
Spanish footballers
Footballers from Barakaldo
Association football midfielders
La Liga players
Segunda División players
Segunda División B players
Tercera División players
CD Basconia footballers
Gernika Club footballers
Athletic Bilbao footballers
UB Conquense footballers
UD Salamanca players
CD Castellón footballers
RC Celta de Vigo players
Córdoba CF players
Sporting de Gijón players
CF Reus Deportiu players
Liga I players
FC Rapid București players
Cypriot First Division players
Doxa Katokopias FC players
Spanish expatriate footballers
Expatriate footballers in Romania
Expatriate footballers in Cyprus
Spanish expatriate sportspeople in Romania
Spanish expatriate sportspeople in Cyprus
Spanish football managers
Segunda División managers
CF Reus Deportiu managers
CD Numancia managers
CD Tenerife managers
Albacete Balompié managers